Rissoina sagraiana is a species of minute sea snail, a marine gastropod mollusk or micromollusk in the family Rissoinidae.

Spelling
Rissoina sagraiana is cited by Desjardin (1949 )as from 1853. The species was first published by D’Orbigny (1842) under the name Rissoina sagra in the caption of the plate and thereby made available under the provisions of article 12.2.7 of the International Code of Zoological Nomenclature; the complete description was published years later (1846) under the name Rissoina sagraiana and the publication in parts was completed only in 1853. Therefore, there are two different spellings of the name, but according to article 32.5.1.1 of the ICZN, correction of the spelling of a name in a later part of a work published in parts constitutes an evidence for an inadverted error and therefore, the species must be cited as Rissoina sagraiana d’Orbigny, 1842 having priority over Rissoina cancellata Philippi, 1847.

Distribution
This species occurs in the Caribbean Sea, the Gulf of Mexico and the Lesser Antilles.

Description 
The maximum recorded shell length is 5.8 mm.

Habitat 
Minimum recorded depth is 0 m. Maximum recorded depth is 128 m.

References

 Rosenberg, G., F. Moretzsohn, and E. F. García. 2009. Gastropoda (Mollusca) of the Gulf of Mexico, Pp. 579–699 in Felder, D.L. and D.K. Camp (eds.), Gulf of Mexico–Origins, Waters, and Biota. Biodiversity. Texas A&M Press, College Station, Texas.
 Rolán E. & Fernández-Garcés R. 2010. New information on the Caribbean Rissoina (Gastropoda, Rissoidae) of the group R. sagraiana-cancellata with the description of a new species. Iberus 28(1): 79–89.

External links
 

Rissoinidae
Gastropods described in 1842